Juan Manuel Vázquez (born 25 July 1994) is an Argentine professional footballer who plays as a midfielder or winger for Barracas Central.

Career
Vázquez started his career in Argentina with All Boys. After being an unused substitute for the Primera B Nacional club in a Copa Argentina tie with Tigre in July 2014, Vázquez made his professional debut on 1 October during a match with Sarmiento; in the process netting All Boys' goal in a 1–0 win. Two goals in thirty-six further appearances followed in his first three campaigns, prior to five goals over the course of the 2016–17 Primera B Nacional as All Boys finished twelfth. Midway through the next campaign, Vázquez departed to join Ascenso MX side Correcaminos UAT. He was subsequently selected seven times in 2017–18.

Vázquez switched Mexican football for Colombian football in June 2018, with the forward agreeing to sign for Deportivo Pasto of Categoría Primera A. His first goal for Deportivo Pasto arrived during his second start, scoring the club's opening goal of a home victory over Alianza Petrolera on 23 September. January 2019 saw Vázquez head to Paraguay with Sportivo Luqueño. Nine appearances and one goal, versus Deportivo Santaní, followed in the Primera División. He departed midway through the year, following a contractual dispute between him and the club; claiming he was owed $52,500.

In early 2020, Vázquez joined Uruguayan Segunda División team Atenas. He featured and scored in a friendly match with Boston River in March, but wouldn't appear in competitive action due to the season's start being delayed due to the COVID-19 pandemic. On 25 August 2020, Vázquez was announced as a new signing back in his homeland for Primera B Nacional outfit Barracas Central.

Career statistics
.

References

External links

1994 births
Living people
Sportspeople from Buenos Aires Province
Argentine footballers
Association football forwards
Argentine expatriate footballers
Primera Nacional players
Ascenso MX players
Categoría Primera A players
Paraguayan Primera División players
All Boys footballers
Correcaminos UAT footballers
Deportivo Pasto footballers
Sportivo Luqueño players
Atenas de San Carlos players
Barracas Central players
Expatriate footballers in Mexico
Expatriate footballers in Colombia
Expatriate footballers in Paraguay
Expatriate footballers in Uruguay
Argentine expatriate sportspeople in Mexico
Argentine expatriate sportspeople in Colombia
Argentine expatriate sportspeople in Paraguay
Argentine expatriate sportspeople in Uruguay